Maurice Kujur (2 November 1935 – 12 January 2020) was an Indian politician. He was elected to the Lok Sabha, the lower house of the Parliament of India from Sundargarh, Odisha as a member of the Indian National Congress.

References

External links
Official Biographical Sketch in Lok Sabha Website

1935 births
2020 deaths
Lok Sabha members from Odisha
India MPs 1984–1989
Indian National Congress politicians
Indian National Congress politicians from Odisha